Nebria fontinalis is a species of ground beetle in the Nebriinae subfamily that can be found in Italy and Switzerland.

Subspecies
The species have only 2 subspecies, all of which are found in Italy and Switzerland:
Nebria fontinalis fontinalis K. Daniel et J. Daniel, 1890
Nebria fontinalis rhaetica K. Daniel et J. Daniel, 1890

References

External links
Nebria fontinalis at Fauna Europaea

fontinalis
Beetles described in 1890
Beetles of Europe